John 1:7 is the seventh verse in the first chapter of the Gospel of John in the New Testament of the Christian Bible.

Content
In the original Greek according to Westcott-Hort this verse is:
Οὗτος ἦλθεν εἰς μαρτυρίαν, ἵνα μαρτυρήσῃ περὶ τοῦ φωτός, ἵνα πάντες πιστεύσωσι δι᾿ αὐτοῦ.  

In the King James Version of the Bible the text reads:
The same came for a witness, to bear witness of the Light, that all men through him might believe.

The New International Version translates the passage as:
He came as a witness to testify concerning that light, so that through him all men might believe.

Analysis
According to Witham, "That all might believe through him;" is John's preaching, who was the instrument of God to induce them to believe in Christ, their Redeemer. According to MacEvilly, “the light” refers to the person of Christ.

Commentary from the Church Fathers
Augustine: "Wherefore came he? The same came for a witness, to bear witness of the Light."

Origen: "Some try to undo the testimonies of the Prophets to Christ, by saying that the Son of God had no need of such witnesses; the wholesome words which He uttered and His miraculous acts being sufficient to produce belief; just as Moses deserved belief for his speech and goodness, and wanted no previous witnesses. To this we may reply, that, where there are a number of reasons to make people believe, persons are often impressed by one kind of proof, and not by another, and God, Who for the sake of all men became man, can give them many reasons for belief in Him. And with respect to the doctrine of the Incarnation, certain it is that some have been forced by the Prophetical writings into an admiration of Christ by the fact of so many prophets having, before His advent, fixed the place of His nativity; and by other proofs of the same kind. It is to be remembered too, that, though the display of miraculous powers might stimulate the faith of those who lived in the same age with Christ, they might, in the lapse of time, fail to do so; as some of them might even get to be regarded as fabulous. Prophecy and miracles together are more convincing than simply past miracles by themselves. We must recollect too that men receive honour themselves from the witness which they bear to God. He deprives the Prophetical choir of immeasurable honour, whoever denies that it was their office to bear witness to Christ. John when he comes to bear witness to the light, follows in the train of those who went before him."

Chrysostom: "Not because the light wanted the testimony, but for the reason which John himself gives, viz. that all might believe on Him. For as He put on flesh to save all men from death; so He sent before Him a human preacher, that the sound of a voice like their own, might the readier draw men to Him."

Bede: "He saith not, that all men should believe in him; for, cursed be the man that trusteth in man; (Jer. 17:5) but, that all men through him might believe; i. e. by his testimony believe in the Light."

Theophylact of Ohrid: " Though some however might not believe, he is not accountable for them. When a man shuts himself up in a dark room, so as to receive no light from the sun’s rays, he is the cause of the deprivation, not the sun. In like manner John was sent, that all men might believe; but if no such result followed, he is not the cause of the failure."

References

External links
Other translations of John 1:7 at BibleHub

01:7
Light and religion